Kot Addu District is a district in the Punjab province of Pakistan. The district headquarter is Kot Addu city. Previously this district was part of Muzaffargarh District as Kot Addu Tehsil.

Administration 
The district is administratively subdivided into two tehsils.

References 

Kot Addu District
Districts of Punjab, Pakistan